Red Leicester (also known simply as Leicester or Leicestershire cheese) is an English cheese, made in a similar manner to Cheddar cheese, although it is crumbly in texture and typically sold at 6 to 12 months of age. The rind is reddish-orange with a powdery mould on it. Since the 18th century, it has been coloured orange by the addition of annatto extract during manufacture. It is a cow's milk cheese, and is named after the city of Leicester, or the ceremonial county it is located in, Leicestershire. 

Traditionally made wheels are fairly firm and dry, with a friable texture and a slightly sweet, mellow flavour that becomes stronger as the cheese matures. Block-made cheeses are moister, and they have a slightly sweet aftertaste and a creamy texture. The cheese has a slightly nutty taste. Versions sold in supermarkets are typically coloured with annatto, although it is possible to obtain Red Leicester without it.

Red Leicester is aged anywhere from four to nine months. "Young" Leicesters, at the beginning of that range, will be very mild; it is usually after six months that an Leicester begins to develop enough of a tang to be classified as "old".
The modern industrial method for aging is to use the Vac-Pac method. Smaller "farmhouse" makers usually still use the traditional way of maturing it in cloth, for a better flavour development.

History 
The cheese was originally made on farms in Leicestershire, England, with surplus milk, once all the Stilton desired was made. It was originally coloured with carrot or beetroot juice.

It used to be called Leicestershire Cheese but came to be called Red Leicester. This was to distinguish it from "White Leicester," which was made to a national wartime recipe in the 1940s due to rationing.

When fresh, the fat content of Red Leicester cheese is generally 33 to 34%. Regulations require that minimum fat levels to be stated in terms of the "fat in dry matter" or FDM. This is because moisture levels decrease as cheese ages. FDM measures the amount of fat present in the solids, which includes protein, minerals, vitamins and salt. The minimum FDM listed for Red Leicester is generally 48%.

References

External links 
 Red Leicester at Cheese.com

Cow's-milk cheeses
English cheeses